Men of Steel is a 1932 British drama film directed by George King and starring John Stuart, Benita Hume and Heather Angel. The screenplay was adapted by Edward Knoblock and Billie Bristow from a novel by Douglas Newton. It was shot at Walton Studios as a quota quickie for distribution by United Artists.

Plot
James Harg (Stuart) and his father work in a steelmaking plant which is incompetently run, with scant attention being paid to worker safety.  In his own time, Harg works on ideas for a revolutionary new manufacturing process for hard steel.  When his father is badly injured in a workplace accident resulting from employer negligence, Harg uses some of the compensation payment to develop his invention to a stage where it can be tested in practice.  It is a huge success and Harg patents his process.  He rises to a position on the board of the company, before staging a coup to oust his former employer and take over the business himself.

Cast
 John Stuart as James 'Iron' Harg
 Benita Hume as Audrey Paxton
 Heather Angel as Ann Ford
 Franklin Dyall as Charles Paxton
 Mary Merrall as Mrs. Harg
 Alexander Field as Sweepy Ford
 Edward Ashley-Cooper as Sylvano

Production background
The film was made at Nettlefold Studios under the quota quickie system for distribution by United Artists and, as its title implies, is set in a steel-producing town.  Location filming took place in Middlesbrough, with the steelworks scenes being shot in the long-defunct Acklam Iron and Steel Works in the town, rendering it of great interest to social and industrial historians of the Teesside area.  Men of Steel does not appear ever to have been shown on television in the UK, nor has it been made available commercially;

Preservation status
Unlike many quota quickie productions, the film has survived and is available to view by appointment at any of the Mediatheques run by the British Film Institute.

References

Bibliography
 Chibnall, Steve. Quota Quickies: The Birth of the British 'B' Film. British Film Institute, 2007.
 Low, Rachael. Filmmaking in 1930s Britain. George Allen & Unwin, 1985.
 Wood, Linda. British Films, 1927-1939. British Film Institute, 1986.

External links 
 
 Men of Steel at BFI Film & TV Database

1932 films
1932 drama films
British drama films
Films directed by George King
British black-and-white films
Films set in Yorkshire
Films set in England
Films based on British novels
United Artists films
Films shot at Nettlefold Studios
1930s English-language films
1930s British films
Quota quickies